The former Pettigrew School, now the Pettigrew Community Building is a historic school building in the small community of Pettigrew, Arkansas.  It is located off County Road 3205, just across the White River from Arkansas Highway 16.  It is a single-story wood-frame structure, with a metal hip roof and weatherboard siding.  An entry section projects from the center of front facade, topped by a gable roof and small belfry.  The building is thought to have been built between 1908 and 1915, and was used as a school until 1963, when the area was consolidated into a larger school district.  It has served as a community hall since then.

The building was listed on the National Register of Historic Places in 1995.

See also
National Register of Historic Places listings in Madison County, Arkansas

References

School buildings on the National Register of Historic Places in Arkansas
Schools in Madison County, Arkansas
National Register of Historic Places in Madison County, Arkansas
School buildings completed in 1915
1915 establishments in Arkansas
Community centers in Arkansas